The Apollo Theater (also Teatro Salón Apolo) is the main theater  of  Miranda de Ebro, (Burgos), Spain.  It is located in the historic center of the city, next to the church of Santa María. Built in 1921 and in a state of ruin since 1987, it was rehabilitated and reopened in 2015.

History 
Where the theater is today, there was a recreational society and a small palace that burned to the ground on December 28, 1918. The owner of the estate, Doña Dolores Ángel-Zorrilla de Velasco, decided to build a new building dedicated to leisure. The new building was designed in 1920 by Fermín Álamo, an architect from La Rioja, and it was inaugurated on October 4, 1921.

It was built in the Italian style.

It is a case of Neoclassical architecture.

References 

Theatres in Spain